The 88th 2011 Lithuanian Athletics Championships were held in S. Darius and S. Girėnas Stadium, Kaunas on 23–24 July 2011.

Men

Track events

Field events

Women

Track events

Field events

References 
Results

External links 
 Lithuanian athletics

Lithuanian Athletics Championships
Athletics
Lithuanian Athletics Championships